The Suicide Tour (10 Years Later) is a 3-disc compilation of Brotha Lynch Hung songs, released by Siccmade Muzicc on October 7, 2014. It features Snoop Dogg, Bad Azz, Keak Da Sneak, Xzibit, Warren G, X-Raided, Art B., Zigg Zagg, Phonk Beta, Loki, D-Dubb, C.O.S., and the original Siccmade Muzicc family.

Track listing

References

Brotha Lynch Hung albums
Horrorcore compilation albums
Gangsta rap compilation albums
West Coast hip hop albums
2014 compilation albums